Kolpochoerus is an extinct genus of the pig family Suidae related to the modern-day genera Hylochoerus and Potamochoerus. It is believed that most of them inhabited African forests, as opposed to the bushpig and red river hog that inhabit open brush and savannas. There are currently eight recognized species.

Species
In taxonomic order:
Genus †Kolpochoerus
 K. deheinzelini — Chad, Ethiopia (Early Pliocene)
 K. afarensis - East Africa (Pliocene)
 K. millensis — Central Afar, Ethiopia (Pliocene)
 K. cookei - Ethiopia (Late Pliocene)
 K. heseloni - East Africa (Plio-Pleistocene)
 K. olduvaiensis - East Africa (Pleistocene)
 K. majus - East Africa (Pleistocene)
 K. phacochoeroides - Morocco (Late Pliocene)
 K. paiceae - South Africa (Pleistocene)
 K. phillipi - Ethiopia (Pleistocene)

References

 Thomas, P. 1884. Recherches stratigraphiques et paléontologiques sur quelques formations d’eau douce de l’Algérie. Mémoires de la Société géologique de France, 3ème série, 3, 1–50. ISSN 0078-8554 Palaeont. afr. (December 2004) 40: 69–83 83
 New skulls of Kolpochoerus phacochoeroides (Suidae: Mammalia) from the late Pliocene of Ahl al Oughlam, Morocco Denis Geraads UPR 2147 du CNRS, 44 rue de l’Amiral Mouchez, 75014 PARIS, France Received 10 August 2004. Accepted 20 December 2004.
Haile-Selassie, Y.; Simpson, S.W. 2013: A new species of Kolpochoerus (Mammalia: Suidae) from the Pliocene of Central Afar, Ethiopia: Its taxonomy and phylogenetic relationships. Journal of mammalian evolution, 20(2): 115–127. doi: 10.1007/s10914-012-9207-0 reference page

¨
Pleistocene mammals of Africa
Pliocene mammals of Africa
Pliocene even-toed ungulates
Pleistocene even-toed ungulates
Fossil taxa described in 1932
Prehistoric even-toed ungulate genera